Senator Benson may refer to:

Members of the United States Senate
Alfred W. Benson (1843–1916), U.S. Senator from Kansas
Elmer Austin Benson (1895–1985), U.S. Senator from Minnesota

United States state senate members
Aslag Benson (1855–1937), North Dakota State Senate
Carville Benson (1872–1929), Maryland State Senate
Duane Benson (1945–2019), Minnesota State Senate
Henry N. Benson (1872–1960), Minnesota State Senate
Joanne C. Benson (born 1941), Maryland State Senate
Joanne Benson (born 1943), Minnesota State Senate
Michelle Benson (born 1968), Minnesota State Senate
Ole E. Benson (1866–1952), Illinois State Senate
Taylor Benson (1922–1996), Wisconsin State Senate